South American youth records in the sport of athletics are the all-time best marks set in competition by aged 17 or younger throughout the entire calendar year of the performance and competing for a member nation of the South American Athletics Confederation (CONSUDATLE). CONSUDATLE maintains these records only in a specific list of outdoor events. All other records, including all indoor records, shown on this list are tracked by statisticians not officially sanctioned by CONSUDATLE.

Outdoor

Key:

A = affected by altitude

h = hand timing

Boys

Girls

Indoor

Boys

Girls

Notes

References
General
CONSUDATLE:South American Records 28 September 2022 updated
Specific

Youth
South America